Springhills is an unincorporated community in northwestern Harrison Township, Champaign County, Ohio, United States.  It lies at the intersection of State Route 245 with Crowl and Springhill-DeGraff Roads.  Graves Creek, a subsidiary of the Great Miami River through Stony Creek, runs along the western edge of Springhills.  It is located 6 miles (9.5 km) west of West Liberty and 11.5 miles (18.5 km) northwest of Urbana, the county seat of Champaign County.

History
Springhills was originally known as Middleburg, and under the latter name was laid out in 1832.  When the post office was to be opened, it was discovered that there was already a Middleburg in Logan County, Ohio, and so the town was renamed Spring Hills for its location near natural springs and at the base of hills.

References

Unincorporated communities in Champaign County, Ohio
Unincorporated communities in Ohio